Drigo is a surname. Notable people with the surname include:

Paola Drigo (1876–1938), Italian short story writer and novelist
Riccardo Drigo (1846–1930), Italian composer of ballet music and Italian opera, theatrical conductor and pianist